Jean-Pierre Ploué is a French car designer, born in 1962, known for bringing the Citroën marque back to strength and restoring its reputation for innovation and strong individualistic styling.

Biography 

Ploué graduated from the École nationale supérieure des arts appliqués et des métiers d'art in 1985. He started his career at Renault from 1985–1995, where he designed the Laguna concept car, the W06 concept that grew into the Twingo, and worked on the design of the Renault Clio II and Megane I.

From 1995 to 1998 he worked at the Volkswagen Design Centre in Wolfsburg, Germany. From 1998 to 1999 Ploué was Head of Exterior Design at Ford in Cologne, Germany.

In 1999 Jean-Pierre Ploué replaced Arthur Blakeslee as Head of the Citroën Design Centre, responsible for rejuvenating the brand's image. His arrival marked a new era for Citroën, resulting in the launch of successful and stylish new models such as the C4, the second generation C5, the C6, and the DS3, which played a strong role in the rebranding of the marque.
Concept-cars C-Sport Lounge, C-Métisse, Citroën Metropolis and GT by Citroën designed by his team show their desire to resume their position as a leader in car design.

In 2009, he was promoted to Director of Design for the PSA group, in charge of designers Gilles Vidal from Peugeot and Thierry Métroz from Citroën since early 2010.

Following the Stellantis merger in 2021, he was appointed the group's chief designer for the European region, including for the Lancia and Alfa Romeo brands as part of their revitalisation strategies.

Awards 
 Jean Pierre Ploué was named Homme de l'Année 2007 (Man of the Year 2007) by Journal de l’Automobile.

References

Citroën
1962 births
Living people
French automobile designers